Possession: a novel is a 1963 English-language novel by Kamala Markandaya.

Plot summary
The action of Possession begins around the year 1949, and continues through the 1950s and early 1960s. An Englishwoman, Lady Caroline Bell, discovers Valmiki, a teenage goatherd who has been painting in local caves, in a village in South India. Snatching Valmiki from the protection of an elderly local swami, she brings him back to London as an exotic pet artist. Jealously guarding Valmiki's attachment to her, Lady Bell cannot stop him eventually returning to India after the suicide of Ellie, a concentration camp survivor whom Valmiki paints and makes pregnant. She follows him back to India, to find him spiritually reattached to the swami and once again painting in the caves around his village.

The 'possession' of the book's title refers both to the woman's desire to own the man, and to his state of being 'possessed' by a foreign identity and values.

References

Further reading
 Hemamalathy, A. An Analysis of Kamala Markandaya’s Possessionas a Novel on the Growing up of the Artist, Language in India, Vol, 12 (2012)
 Nemet, Sofija, 'Hybridity in Jamala Markandaya's Possession.' Filolog, Vol. 13, No. 13 (June 2016), pp.402-416
 Sethuraman, Ramchandryan. Writing across cultures: sexual/racial 'othering' in Kamala Markandaya's Possession. ARIEL: A Review of International English Literature, Vol 23, No. 3 (July 1992), pp. 101-120

Indian English-language novels
20th-century Indian novels
1963 Indian novels
John Day Company books